Auto Europe is a large car rental wholesale company, working with approximately 24,000 car rental locations in 180 countries in Europe, Asia, Africa, Australia, New Zealand, as well as North and South America. Auto Europe has been accredited with the Better Business Bureau since 2 April 1993, with an A+ rating. Auto Europe has been owned by Court Square Capital Partners since 2006.

International car rental is the main service sold by Auto Europe. In addition to traditional self-driven rental cars, Auto Europe books luxury and sport vehicles, motorhome and campervan rentals, European Leasing, as well as chauffeur and airport transfer services.

Auto Europe was founded in Germany in 1954 by Alex Cecil. The company got its start purchasing cars to rent to U.S. travelers in Europe. Cecil later moved to New York and eventually relocated the company to Maine. In 1997, Alex Cecil retired, passing the reins to Imad Khalidi, President and CEO of Auto Europe.

In 1995, Auto Europe began offering airfare and hotels under the name Destination Europe. In 2010, they re-branded this division as Fly International.

Car Hire
Auto Europe collaborates with a number of suppliers including Europcar, Thrifty Car Rental, Avis, Budget, Dollar, Enterprise, Sixt, National Car Rental, Alamo, Buchbinder, Ezi Car Rental, First Car Rental, County Car Rentals, Rhodium and more.

European Car Leasing
Auto Europe has partnered with Peugeot Car-2-Europe, Renault Eurodrive, Citroën Car-2-Europe and DS Car-2-Europe to provide another option for long-term car hire in Europe. Those travelling around Europe 21 to 175 days can travel freely throughout over 40 European countries.

Motorhome Rental
Auto Europe offers motorhome hire in a number of countries with a range of supplies including: Apollo, Maui, Mighty Campers, Britz, Cruise America, Cruise Canada, Bunk Campers, Anywhere Campers, McRent, Road Bear, Star RV, CanaDream, Just Go, Avis Car-Away and more. Auto Europe services various countries all around the globe including: Australia, New Zealand, the United States, most of Europe, United Kingdom, Ireland, Japan and more.

Luxury Car Hire
Auto Europe offers a range of high-end vehicles such as Aston Martin, Audi, Bentley, Ferrari, Lamborghini, Maserati, Mercedes-Benz, Porsche, Range Rover and more to choose from in various locations worldwide.

Travel Industry Awards
Auto Europe has been nominated for numerous World Travel Awards, including Europe's Leading Car Rental Company (2005, 2006, 2007, 2008, 2009, 2010, 2011, 2012), Europe's Leading Business Car Rental Company (2009, 2010, 2011, 2012), and Europe's Leading Chauffeur Company (2013, 2014). In 2014 Auto Europe received its 5th Magellan Award as a silver winner in the Car Rental – Overall Luxury Car Collection category. Most recently, Auto Europe took home a number of awards at the 2019 Magellan Awards in ground transportation. The gold category awards were both the Overall-Luxury Car Collection award and the Car Service – Overall-Worldwide Coverage award.

Leadership & charities
Imad Khalidi is the chief executive officer and president of Auto Europe, LLC. He joined Auto Europe as executive vice president of marketing and sales in 1990 and has served as president since 1992. Prior to 1990, Mr. Khalidi was with Europcar International S.A. from 1983 to 1990, serving as an international travel trade manager and an international licensee manager. He is a member of the Association of Retail Travel Agencies, ASTA and CLIA.
In 2014 Auto Europe partnered with Toys for Tots, donating a portion of profit from every car rental booked during the weeks leading up to Christmas to the US Marine Corps Charity. Auto Europe is also a corporate sponsor for the "Art All Around" project through the Maine Center for Creativity.

References

External links
 

1954 establishments in West Germany
Car rental companies of the United States
Companies based in Portland, Maine
German companies established in 1954
Retail companies established in 1954
Transport companies established in 1954